Vincent Wetta (born December 5, 1945) was a Democratic member of the Kansas House of Representatives, representing the 80th district (Sumner County), from 2007 to 2013.

Wetta was born in Wichita and lived in Wellington, where he worked as a conductor/engineer with the Burlington Northern-Santa Fe Railway Company from 1966 to 2006. He graduated from Wichita State University with a BA in political science in 1996. He is married with three children.

Wetta has been president and on the board of directors of the Panhandle Federal Credit Union, as well as being a member of the Crusader Club, Knights of Columbus and Wellington Rotary Club.

Committee membership
 Energy and Utilities
 Transportation
 Agriculture and Natural Resources

Major donors
The top five donors to Wetta's 2008 campaign:
1. Kimball Insurance Agency Inc: $1,000 
2. Kansas Contractors Assoc: $600 	
3. Kansas Medical Society: $500 	
4. Shank, Hank, Heather & Scott: $500 	
5. McAlister, Tom: $500

References

External links
 Project Vote Smart profile
 Kansas Votes profile
 State Surge - Legislative and voting track record
 Campaign contributions: 1996,2000,  2006, 2008

Democratic Party members of the Kansas House of Representatives
Living people
People from Wellington, Kansas
1945 births
Wichita State University alumni
21st-century American politicians